Southside is an unincorporated community in Hardin County, Tennessee, United States. Southside is located at the intersection of Tennessee State Route 57 and Tennessee State Route 142 near the Mississippi border.

References

Unincorporated communities in Hardin County, Tennessee
Unincorporated communities in Tennessee